Howick is an eastern suburb of Auckland, New Zealand, forming part of what is sometimes called East Auckland. Modern Howick draws much of its character from the succeeding waves of Asian settlement that it has experienced since New Zealand's immigration reforms of the 1980s, with a strong Chinese New Zealander presence in the suburb's business and education sectors.

Demographics

Howick had a population of 11,067 at the 2018 New Zealand census, an increase of 555 people (5.3%) since the 2013 census, and an increase of 1,269 people (13.0%) since the 2006 census. There were 3,822 households, comprising 5,325 males and 5,739 females, giving a sex ratio of 0.93 males per female, with 2,199 people (19.9%) aged under 15 years, 2,058 (18.6%) aged 15 to 29, 5,184 (46.8%) aged 30 to 64, and 1,626 (14.7%) aged 65 or older.

Ethnicities were 67.6% European/Pākehā, 6.2% Māori, 3.8% Pacific peoples, 27.1% Asian, and 3.5% other ethnicities. People may identify with more than one ethnicity.

The percentage of people born overseas was 46.1, compared with 27.1% nationally.

Although some people chose not to answer the census's question about religious affiliation, 46.1% had no religion, 39.2% were Christian, 0.2% had Māori religious beliefs, 2.6% were Hindu, 1.1% were Muslim, 2.0% were Buddhist and 2.5% had other religions.

Of those at least 15 years old, 2,469 (27.8%) people had a bachelor's or higher degree, and 1,107 (12.5%) people had no formal qualifications. 1,968 people (22.2%) earned over $70,000 compared to 17.2% nationally. The employment status of those at least 15 was that 4,647 (52.4%) people were employed full-time, 1,239 (14.0%) were part-time, and 279 (3.1%) were unemployed.

History

Māori origins 
The local iwi (Māori tribe) was Ngāi Tai, people of Tainui descent. They had lived there for around 300 years with pā (fortified villages) at Ōhuiarangi (Pigeon Mountain), Te Waiarohia (Musick Point) and Tūwakamana (Cockle Bay).

Fencible settlement

The Howick, Pakuranga, and Whitford areas were part of the Fairburn purchase in 1836. William Thomas Fairburn, with his wife and family, established a Church Missionary Society Mission Station at Maraetai. Fairburn bought the land with his life savings.

In 1840, following the Treaty of Waitangi, the Government took  from Ngāi Tai, which it used for the Fencible settlements of Ōtāhuhu and Howick and sold most of the remaining land to settlers.
The general area around Howick was known by the names of Paparoa ("the place of the long river") or Owairoa for several centuries prior to being renamed Howick. It was controversially given its new name by Governor George Grey in 1847 and not officially adopted until 1923.

Howick itself is named after British parliamentarian Henry George Grey, 3rd Earl Grey as Viscount Howick, who was Secretary at War and Secretary for the Colonies. He was responsible for the Royal New Zealand Fencible Corps immigration scheme. The suburb was therefore established in 1847 as a fencible settlement, where soldiers were given land with the implied understanding that in wartime, they would be raised as units to defend it (however, the eventual fighting a decade later used professional soldiers instead). A relatively large amount of the early features from this time have been retained.

Māori labourers built the Fencibles cottages under Royal Engineers supervision, although it was noted that initially, the Europeans had to live in raupo huts, having been falsely promised that houses would already be available for them and their families. There were about 250 Fencibles in Howick. Local Māori had been taught to read and write by the Fairburn LMS missionaries at Maraetai. The Fencibles and their families were poor with no capital apart from a small number of officers. About half were Catholic and half Protestant. Quite a few of the adults were illiterate. 101 Howick fencibles served with their sons in the 1860s New Zealand Wars.

Howick's links to Auckland's pioneering and Fencible past has influenced its development and is also evident in the names of many streets. Others are significantly named for British military heroes or battles. Bleakhouse (as in Bleakhouse Rd) was the name given to a Fencible officer's house built in Bleakhouse Rd for Surgeon-Captain John Bacot who became a magistrate in Howick.

Other roads such as Bacot, Bell, Fencible Drive, Montressor Place and Sale Street, plus many others, also have Fencible connexions, e.g. Sir Robert Sale was one of the ships which brought the Fencibles to Auckland in the 19th century. Montressor Place was named for Captain Charles Henry Montressor-Smith who arrived in Howick with the First Battalion of Fencibles in 1847. He later moved to a property in neighbouring Pakuranga, where his house, known as Bell House, still stands at the end of Bell Rd next to the Howick Historical Village.

Moore St was named after General Sir John Moore, a British military hero, who lived from 1761 to 1809. General Moore fought against Napoleon alongside Sir David Baird for whom Baird St was named and he (Moore) died at Corunna during the Peninsular War whilst serving under the Duke of Wellington. At Corunna he was attended by Dr J. Bacot, father of the Howick Fencible doctor, who lived in Bleakhouse. Moore St was part of the original Fencible village and was sub-divided into  allotments down to Rodney St. People will, no doubt, recognise that Wellington and Nelson Sts spring from the most famous of British war heroes, Lord Nelson and the Duke of Wellington and that Selwyn Rd takes its name from the first Bishop of New Zealand, George Augustus Selwyn.

Then there are streets such as Granger Road named for John Granger, manager of the brickworks, which once stood at Little Bucklands Beach near the rock outcrop where the Bucklands Beach Centre board clubrooms now stand, before moving to Whitford. Litten Rd and John Gill Rd are named after the former farmer and landowner families. An Irishman, John Gill, settled in Howick in the 1850s, and his family farmed the land that is now Cockle Bay and Shelly Park. Litten Road is the boundary of one of the old Gill-Litten farms. To the north of Picton Street, the main street of Howick is Stockade Hill. In 1863 a field work was constructed on what is now called Stockade Hill, for the purpose of defending Auckland from Māori who might advance overland from the south, or by canoes from the Firth of Thames. The ditches of the stockade can still be seen today. In the centre is a war memorial where services are held each ANZAC Day.

Growth into town and suburb 

Settlement in Howick centred around the domain, and the village developed as a service centre for the prosperous farming community. Later the centre of Howick shifted to Picton Street which is now the centre. It later became popular as a retirement and seaside holiday location.

In late 1865 the Panmure Bridge, spanning the Tāmaki River, was opened to the public, allowing easier connections between the Auckland isthmus and Howick. In 1865 Howick became a road board district; in 1922 it was created an independent town district; and on 1 February 1952 it was constituted a borough with Elections for Mayor and Council being held on 22 March 1952.

The 1930s saw the construction of a concrete all-weather road running all the way from Howick through Pakuranga to Panmure. This allowed the rapid passage of people and goods to and from Auckland. This concrete road can still be seen, in parts, on the highway between Howick and Pakuranga.

From the late 1940s to the 1970s the Howick area experienced rapid growth, when in 1947, at its centenary, it had still been a town of only 1,500. Up until the 1980s Howick was surrounded on all sides by farmland, but as Auckland grew and new subdivisions were created Howick was consumed by urban sprawl.

In 1989 the local government reorganisation in New Zealand saw Howick become a ward within Manukau City, with its Borough Council being replaced by a Community Board and Councillor representation.

Today Howick is one of the more affluent seaside suburbs of the former Manukau City (now merged with Auckland). It has some of the oldest buildings in the Auckland area, as well as the first parish church in Auckland (All Saints Church).

In July 2008 the community radio station, East FM (formerly Howick Village Radio), was established on 88.1 FM broadcasting over most of the eastern suburb and on 107.1 FM broadcasting into Botany, Flat Bush, and East Tamaki. Worldwide streaming is also available from their website. They have a variety of shows including some hosted by students from local schools.

Asian Settlement 

Following the range of immigration reforms passed by New Zealand's parliament in the 1980s, Howick alongside much of east-Auckland observed a dramatic shift in its demographic makeup, as thousands of newly arrived Asian immigrants settled in the area, altering the suburb's then predominating New Zealand European character, bringing with them Chinese academic and cultural institutions, Cherry Blossom lined streets, and new housing developments built on the principles of Feng-Shui. 

The congregation of affluent Asian New Zealanders in Howick and Botany Downs did much to further feed into the narrative of the area as being a ‘wealthy Asian enclave’, which had started to arise as the presence of New Zealanders of other ethnicities begun to be eclipsed by the newly conceived Asian character of East Auckland.

Howick electorate
From 1993 and prior to the introduction of MMP in 1996, Howick had its own seat in Parliament, Howick; which had been created from part of the former Otara electorate.

In the 1996 general election, due to the need to decrease the number of general electorates to ensure a sufficient number of seats were available for list MPs, the population centres formerly in the Howick seat were merged into the former separate seat of Pakuranga.

While making recommendations for the boundaries to apply in the 2008 general election, the Electoral Commission recently proposed to resurrect the Howick seat.  The planned seat would have taken in the population centres of Howick and Botany Downs-Dannemora but would have had the effect of splitting Bucklands Beach and Highland Park across two electorates.  Due to this, and the planned move to incorporate Panmure, Point England and Glen Innes into the neighbouring Pakuranga seat, the commission received a significant number of objections from Pakuranga residents.  The Commission eventually adopted the recommendation of Objector N17/30 in keeping the Howick suburb in Pakuranga and renaming the new seat Botany, with a corresponding shift in centre of gravity to the new suburb of Flat Bush.

Mayors of Howick
During its existence from 1952 to 1989, the borough of Howick had six mayors:

Economy and amenities

Meadowlands Shopping Centre

Meadowlands Shopping Centre opened in Howick in 1993 and was upgraded in 2011. The mall has dozens of shops, including a Countdown supermarket. It originally also originally housed a McDonald's restaurant and drive-through. The shopping centre was sold by Bayleys amid the COVID-19 pandemic in 2020 to a private developer for $23 million.

Emilia Maud Nixon Garden of Memories 
Originally built in the mid-1930s, a small wharenui is located behind the village's library and arts centre. The 'Garden of Memories' was developed by Howick resident Emilia Maude Nixon to "promote understanding, harmony and goodwill between all people". Nixon planted native trees and grew traditional food eaten by Maori. A waka was also located in the garden, with the wharenui named Torere - after the daughter of Hoturoa, the chief of the Tainui. Kuia and kaumātua visited the garden for a dedication in 1936.

After Nixon's death in 1962, the garden was managed by the Howick Borough Council while Torere was managed by the Howick and District Historical Society. In the following decades, the wharenui was occasionally  vandalised and left largely unmaintained. The original structure was demolished and rebuilt by the Manukau City Council following the 1989 New Zealand local government reforms - though the wharenui's facade and carvings were maintained. Following the rebuilding of Torere, the building was used for classes and activities organised by volunteers.

An attempt to name the wharenui a "marae" by its managing trust prompted over 300 submissions by residents in 1997 - and signs bearing the name were gratified over. The opposition and council response sparked a Race Relations Office investigation. But Torere itself was damaged beyond repair following a fire in October 2004 - fire investigators found the incident was likely a result of an arson attack, while some locals blamed the fire on an electrical fault. The wharenui rebuild project was contested by some locals, notably the Howick Ratepayers and Residents Association, and was only completed in 2011.

Museums

The Polish Heritage Trust Museum has been operating in Howick in 2004.

Howick Historical Village, a living history museum run by Howick & Districts Historical Society and located in Pakuranga, opened in 1980 to recreate the Fencible settlement of Howick. The original historic buildings, sourced from around Howick and its environs, were saved from demolition in the late 1970s and early 1980s and moved to Lloyd Elsmore Park in Pakuranga. The Village has expanded its mission to include a broader representation of Tāmaki Makaurau Auckland with a focus on the period 1840–1880.

Sport and recreation
Howick is home to Fencibles United association football club, who compete in the Lotto Sport Italia NRFL Division 2, and the Howick Hornets rugby league club, who compete in Auckland Rugby League's top division, the Fox Memorial.

Within the Howick ward there are two 18-hole golf courses. The Howick golf club and course located at Musick Point and the Pakuranga golf club and course, influencing the name of the suburb surrounding it, Golflands.

Education

All these schools are coeducational. Rolls are as of

Climate
Under the Köppen climate classification, Howick has an oceanic climate (Köppen climate classification Cfb), with warm humid summers and mild damp winters.

Temperature
Compared to other places on a similar latitude (particularly those in the northern hemisphere), there are relatively small variations in temperature between summer and winter, as well as relatively small temperature variations throughout the day. This is due to the proximity and influence of the surrounding ocean curtailing any extremes in temperature. Since records began in 2010, air temperatures below  are very rare having only been recorded 4 times. Daily high temperatures above  are also very rare having only been recorded twice.

Rainfall
Rainfall is usually plentiful throughout the year averaging around  however the winter months on average see more rain than the summer months. Between December and April, storms from the tropics can occasionally pass through or near the region bringing with it heavy rain. The record highest daily rainfall of  occurred on 27 January 2023 during the 2023 North Island floods. The most consecutive wet days (≥1 mm) is 12 recorded in the period 26 July 2016 – 6 August 2016. There are no recorded instances of snowfall. Occasionally droughts do occur during the warmer months, for example the 3 months Jan-Mar 2013 saw only  of rainfall, and the 6 months Nov 2019 - Apr 2020 saw only  of rainfall.

Climate Data

References

Further reading
 
  – history of the town to 1900 and biographies of some local notable people during the latter half of the 19th century.

External links
 Internet Radio Station Supporting Howick
 Howick Historical Village
 Howick Village
 East FM
 Howick Historic Walk
 Howick Little Theatre Incorporated
 Photographs of Howick held in Auckland Libraries' heritage collections.

Suburbs of Auckland
Howick Local Board Area